Zanjireh (also Romanized as Zanjīreh) is a village in Qarah Quyun-e Jonubi Rural District, Qarah Quyun District, Showt County, West Azerbaijan Province, Iran. At the 2006 census, its population was 58, in 15 families.

References 

Populated places in Showt County